Alisi Galo also known as Aliso Galo (born 25 May 1996) is a Fijian netball player who plays for Fiji in the positions of center or wing defense. She was included in the Fijian squad for the 2019 Netball World Cup, which was also her maiden appearance at a Netball World Cup. 

She also represented Fiji at the 2018 Commonwealth Games, her maiden appearance at a Commonwealth Games event.

References 

1996 births
Living people
Fijian netball players
Netball players at the 2018 Commonwealth Games
Commonwealth Games competitors for Fiji
2019 Netball World Cup players